Aber and Inver are common elements in place-names of Celtic origin. Both mean "confluence of waters" or "river mouth".  Their distribution reflects the geographical influence of the Brittonic and Goidelic language groups, respectively.

Aber
Aber goes back to Common Brittonic.  In Old Welsh it has the form oper (later aper) and is derived from an assumed *od-ber, meaning 'pouring away'. This is derived from the Proto-Indo-European root *bher-, 'carry' (English bear, Latin fero) with the prefix ad-, 'to'. It is found in Welsh, Cornish and Breton.

Place names with aber are very common in Wales. They are also common on the east coast of Scotland, where they are assumed to be of Pictish origin. They are found to a lesser extent in Cornwall and other parts of England and Brittany. It may be that the relative dearth in Cornwall is simply a result of there being fewer rivers on a peninsula.

In Anglicised forms, aber is often contracted: Arbroath (formerly "Aberbrothick") for Aber Brothaig, Abriachan for Aber Briachan.  In the case of Applecross (first attested as Aporcrosan), it has been transformed by a folk etymology. (Its Scottish Gaelic name, a' Chomraich, has lost the "Aber-" element altogether)

"Aber" is rendered into Scottish Gaelic as Oba(i)r, e.g. Obar Dheadhain "Aberdeen", Obar Pheallaidh "Aberfeldy", and Obar Phuill "Aberfoyle."

The Welsh names Abergwaun (Fishguard), Aberhonddu (Brecon),  Aberteifi (Cardigan), Aberdaugleddau (Milford Haven),  Aberpennar (Mountain Ash) and Abertawe (Swansea) all contain Aber- in their Welsh language equivalent.

Inver
This is derived from the same Proto-Indo-European root *bher-, but with the prefix in-, 'into'. The word also occurs in Manx in the form Inver 

Place-names with inver are very common throughout Scotland, where they outnumber aber-names by about 3:1. They are most common throughout the Western Highlands and the Grampians, the largest town containing the element being Inverness. Place-names with inver are, however, oddly seldom in Ireland, given that the form is originally Irish; Ireland tends instead to have names with béal ('mouth') in such locations, as Béal Átha na Sluaighe (Ballinasloe, Co. Galway), Béal an Átha an Fheá (Ballina, Co. Mayo) or Béal Feirste (Belfast). The difference in usage may be explained by the fact that Gaelic names in Ireland are typically a thousand years older than those in Scotland, and hence the prevailing fashion could have been different.

In Anglicised forms, inver occasionally appears as inner, such as Innerleithen. Innerhaddon is variant of Inverhaddon.

In some cases, an "Inver" has been lost, e.g. Ayr (Inbhir Air), which was recorded as "Inberair", and Ayre (Inver Ayre) in the Isle of Man.

Occasionally, the English name forms are entirely unrelated: Dingwall (Inbhir Pheofharan) Scotland and Arklow in Ireland both have "Inbhir-" in their Gaelic forms.

Syntax
Because Celtic languages place the generic element of a compound (what kind of thing it is) before the specific element (which one it is), the elements aber and inver normally appear at the beginning of a place name, the opposite of the English (Germanic) pattern. Contrast:
Inverness (mouth of the river Ness)
Eyemouth (mouth of the river Eye)
Since these names refer to rivermouths (or towns built on rivermouths), the elements aber and inver are the generic elements, whereas the other element (typically the name of the river) is the specific element, telling us which rivermouth is meant.

A variation occurs when the confluence or estuary itself is made the specific element. The names Lochaber and Lochinver mean 'loch of the rivermouth'; in both cases, these are sealochs which function as extended estuaries of medium-sized rivers. Here, the elements aber and inver answer the question "Which loch?" Similarly the name Rossinver refers to a promontary (Irish: ros) jutting out into Lough Melvin just 200 meters east of the mouth of the Glenariff River. Kilninver (Cil an inbhir) means "rivermouth church". Cuan an inver means "estuary bay". In these cases, exceptionally, the elements aber and inver come second.

This is consistent with the stress patterns of these names. Placenames, like other compound nouns, are generally stressed on the specific element. Therefore, the elements aber and inver never carry word-stress, except in the rare occasions where they are in final position: Inverness, Aberfan, but Rossinver.

Use in British colonies
Place names from the British isles were frequently exported to the colonies which became the British Empire, often without any thought being given to etymology. Thus there are many examples in the United States and in Commonwealth countries of places with names in Aber- or Inver- which are not located at a confluence. In Gaelic-speaking Nova Scotia, however, the element Inbhir- seems to have been productive in its original sense.

Invercargill in the South Island of New Zealand is a special case. It was first named Inverkelly in honour of an early settler called Kelly, and was then renamed in honour of Captain William Cargill, who was at the time the Superintendent of Otago, of which Southland was then a part. Since the city was indeed built at the mouth of the Waihopai River, the Inver- element was apparently chosen consciously.

List of place-names with Aber and Inver

Australia
Aberdare, Aberdeen (New South Wales), Aberdeen (South Australia), Aberdeen (Tasmania), Abermain, Aberglasslyn, Inverell, Inverloch, Inveresk, Invermay, Inverleigh, Invergordon

Wales
Aberaeron, Aberaman, Aberangell, Aberarth, Aberavon, Aberbanc, Aberbargoed, Aberbeeg, Abercanaid, Abercarn, Abercastle, Abercegir, Abercraf, Abercregan, Abercych, Abercynon, Aberdare, Aberdaron, [ Aberdulais]Aberdaugleddau (Milford Haven), Aberdulais, Aberdyfi, Aberedw, Abereiddy, Abererch, Aberfan, Aberffraw, [Aberkenfig][ Aberogwr][ Abergarw][Aberthin][Aberffrwd, Ceredigion]], Aberffrwd, Monmouthshire, Abergavenny, Abergele, Abergorlech, Abergwaun (Fishguard), Aberkenfig, Abergwesyn, Abergwili, Abergwynfi, Abergwyngregyn, Abergynolwyn, Aberhafesp, Aberhonddu (Brecon), Aberllefenni, Abermaw (Barmouth), Abermorddu, Abermule, Abernant, Carmarthenshire, Abernant, Powys, Abernant, Rhondda Cynon Taf, Aberpennar (Mountain Ash), Aberporth, Aberriw (Berriew), Abersoch, Abersychan, Abertawe (Swansea), Aberteifi (Cardigan - town), Abertillery, Aberthin, Abertillery, Abertridwr (Caerphilly), Abertridwr (Powys), Aberystwyth, Llanaber

Ireland
An tInbhear Mór (Arklow, Co. Wicklow), Cuan an Inbhir (Broadhaven Bay), Inbhear (Inver, Co. Donegal), Inbhear nOllarbha (Larne Lough, Co. Antrim), Inbhear Scéine the traditional name for Kenmare Bay, Co. Kerry, Rossinver

Scotland
Aberarder, Aberargie, Aberbothrie, Abercairney, Aberchalder, Aberchirder, Abercorn, Abercrombie, Aberdalgie, Aberdeen, Aberdour, Aberfeldy, Aberfoyle, Abergairn, Abergeldie, Aberlady, Aberlemno, Aberlour, Abermilk, Abernethy, Aberscross, Abersky, Abertarff, Abertay, Aberuchill, Aberuthven, Abriachan, Applecross, Arbirlot, Arboll, Arbuthnott, Arbroath (historically Aberbrothick - Obar Bhrothaig), Fochabers, Kinnaber, Lochaber, Obar Neithich (Nethybridge), Slongaber

Achininver, Inbhir Air (Ayr formerly "Inberair" etc.), Inbhir Bhrùra (Brora), Inbhir Chalain (Kalemouth), Inbhir Eireann (Findhorn), Inbhir Eighe (Eyemouth), Inbhir Ghrainnse (Grangemouth), Inbhir Nàrann (Nairn), Inbhir Pheofharain (Dingwall), Inbhir Theòrsa, Inbhir Ùige (Wick), Innerleithen, Innerleven, Innerwick (in Perth and Kinross), Inver, Inverarnan, Inverallan, Inveraldie, Inveralmond Inveramsay, Inveran, Inveraray, Inverbervie, Inverclyde, Inveresk, Inverfarigaig, Invergarry, Invergordon, Invergowrie, Inverhaddon (or Innerhaddon), Inverkeilor, Inverkeithing, Inverkeithney, Inverkip, Inverleith, Inverlochlarig, Inverlochy, Invermoriston, Inverness, Inveroran, Invershin, Inversnaid, Invertrossachs, Inverugie, Inveruglas, Inverurie, Kilninver, Lochinver

Notes - "Bail' Inbhir Fharrair",( is an uncommon name for Beauly, usually "A' Mhanachain"); Fort William was formerly known as Inverlochy, and a small district nearby is still referred to as such. Inbhir Ghrainnse and Inbhir Eighe may be of modern origin.

Brittany

England
The Cornish names of Falmouth (Aberfal) and Plymouth (Aberplymm). Aberford in West Yorkshire has a different origin. Berwick may have had the aber- prefix originally. According to Llywarch Hên, an Aber Lleu near Lindisfarne was the site of Urien of Rheged's assassination.

Isle of Man
Inver Ayre (Ayre)

Canada
Italicised names denote usage in Canadian Gaelic.

Loch Abar (Lochaber, NS)

Baile Inbhir Nis (Inverness, NS), Siorramachd Inbhir Nis (Inverness County, NS), Inbhir-pheofharain (Dingwall, NS), Inverhuron, ON, Invermere, BC

New Zealand
Invercargill

Sources
David Dorward, Scotland's Place Names, Mercat Press, Edinburgh, 2001.

References

See also
 
 
 

Place name element etymologies
Celtic toponyms
English suffixes
Prefixes